In enzymology, a kynurenate-7,8-dihydrodiol dehydrogenase is an enzyme that catalyzes the chemical reaction

7,8-dihydro-7,8-dihydroxykynurenate + NAD+  7,8-dihydroxykynurenate + NADH + H+

Thus, the two substrates of this enzyme are 7,8-dihydro-7,8-dihydroxykynurenate and NAD+, whereas its 3 products are 7,8-dihydroxykynurenate, NADH, and H+.

This enzyme belongs to the family of oxidoreductases, specifically those acting on the CH-CH group of donor with NAD+ or NADP+ as acceptor.  The systematic name of this enzyme class is 7,8-dihydro-7,8-dihydroxykynurenate:NAD+ oxidoreductase. Other names in common use include 7,8-dihydro-7,8-dihydroxykynurenate dehydrogenase, and 7,8-dihydroxykynurenic acid 7,8-diol dehydrogenase.  This enzyme participates in tryptophan metabolism.

References 

 

EC 1.3.1
NADH-dependent enzymes
Enzymes of unknown structure